Hwang Sun-ho (born 21 April 1975) is a former South Korean badminton player. He played badminton since in elementary school in Jeonju with his teammates former Olympic gold medalists, Kim Dong-moon and Ha Tae-kwon. Hwang affiliated with SEMCO team since 1997, emerge as national team singles ace after Lee Kwang-jin, Kim Hak-kyun and Park Sung-woo retired. He was part of the national team that won the gold medal in 1997 East Asian Games, and a bronze medal at the 1998 Asian Games. The best individual achievements in his career was being a champion in 1999 Hungarian International tournament in the men's singles event. Hwang represented his country competed at the 2000 Summer Olympics in the men's singles event, reaching into the third round. Hwang joined the conscription in South Korea for two years, and returned to play with SEMCO team. In 2004, he started his badminton career in Japan, invited by Park Sung-woo who was a coach there. He returned to Korea in 2005, and began a career as a coach in Hwasun County. He then became a badminton coach in Gyeonggi Province, and also member of Gyeonggi Badminton Federation. Hwang graduated from Wonkwang University with Physical Education and Sports Science degree.

Achievements

World Junior Championships 
Boys' doubles

IBF International 
Men's singles

Men's doubles

Mixed doubles

References

External links
 
 
 
 

1975 births
Living people
South Korean male badminton players
Olympic badminton players of South Korea
Badminton players at the 2000 Summer Olympics
Badminton players at the 1998 Asian Games
Asian Games bronze medalists for South Korea
Asian Games medalists in badminton
Badminton coaches
Medalists at the 1998 Asian Games